Luke James Woodcock (born 19 March 1982) is a former New Zealand cricketer who has played for New Zealand in limited over internationals. He also played for Wellington in New Zealand's domestic competitions. An all-rounder, he batted left handed and bowled left-arm orthodox spin. In March 2019, Woodcock announced his retirement from the game.

Domestic career
In October 2017, in the 2017–18 Plunket Shield season, he and Michael Papps made an opening partnership of 432 runs for Wellington. This was the highest opening partnership and the highest partnership for any wicket in first-class cricket in New Zealand.

The following month, he played in his 128th game for Wellington, the most first-class appearances for a player with one team in New Zealand.

In June 2018, he was awarded a contract with Wellington for the 2018–19 season.

International career
He has represented New Zealand in the One Day International and Twenty20 International forms of the game, making his debuts against Pakistan during the 2010–11 season.

References

1982 births
Living people
New Zealand cricketers
Wellington cricketers
New Zealand One Day International cricketers
New Zealand Twenty20 International cricketers
Cricketers at the 2011 Cricket World Cup